Markus Hillukkala (born 1987) is a Swedish Bandy player who currently plays for Bollnäs GIF (2005-) as a defender.  Markus was a youth product of Oxelösunds IK (2003-2005) and moved when he was a teenager to Bollnäs GIF.  Markus played for the Swedish under-19 team during the 2005/06 season.

External links
  Markus Hillukkala at bandysidan
  Bollnäs gif

Swedish bandy players
Living people
1987 births
Place of birth missing (living people)
Bollnäs GIF players
Falu BS players
Surte BK players
Gripen Trollhättan BK players
IFK Kungälv players